This article shows the squads of all participating teams at the women's field hockey tournament at the 2020 Summer Olympics in Tokyo.

In July 2021, the IOC allowed teams to nominate up to 18 players instead of the usual 16, due to the COVID-19 pandemic.

Age, caps and club as of 24 July 2021.

Group A

Germany

The squad was announced on 27 May 2021.

Head coach:  Xavier Reckinger

Reserve:
Nathalie Kubalski (GK)

Great Britain

The squad was announced on 17 June 2021.

Head coach:  Mark Hager

Reserves:
Sabbie Heesh (GK)
Joanne Hunter

India

The squad was announced on 17 June 2021.

Ireland

The squad was announced on 21 June 2021.

Head coach:  Sean Dancer

Reserve:
Elizabeth Murphy (GK)

Netherlands

The squad was announced on 16 June 2021.

Head coach:  Alyson Annan

Reserve:
Anne Veenendaal (GK)

South Africa

The squad was announced on 27 May 2021.

Head coach: Robin Van Ginkel

Reserves:
Marlize van Tonder (GK)

Group B

Argentina

The squad was announced on 21 June 2021.

Head coach: Carlos Retegui

Reserves:
Clara Barberi (GK)

Australia

The squad was announced on 14 June 2021.

Head coach: Katrina Powell

Reserves:
Jocelyn Bartram

China

Head coach: Wang Yang

Japan

The squad was announced on 8 June 2021.

Head coach:  Xavier Arnau

New Zealand

The squad was announced on 10 June 2021.

Head coach:  Graham Shaw

Spain

The squad was announced on 5 July 2021.

Head coach:  Adrian Lock

Reserves:
Melaní García

References

2020
squads
Field hockey Women's